The Tulane Green Wave are the athletic teams that represent Tulane University, located in New Orleans, Louisiana. Tulane competes in NCAA Division I as a member of the American Athletic Conference (The American). There are 14 Green Wave intercollegiate programs.

Nickname
Tulane's nickname was adopted during the 1920 season, after a song titled "The Rolling Green Wave" was published in the Tulane Hullabaloo in 1920. From 1893 to 1919 the athletic teams of Tulane were officially known as "The Olive and Blue," for the official school colors. In 1919 the Tulane Weekly, one of Tulane's many student newspapers at the time and the predecessor of the Tulane Hullabaloo, began referring to the football team as the "Greenbacks," an unofficial nickname that also led to another: the "Greenies."

History
The university was a charter member of the Southeastern Conference (SEC), in which it competed until 1966.  Tulane, along with other academically-oriented, private schools had considered forming the Southern Ivy League (a.k.a. Magnolia Conference) in the 1950s. It joined the newly formed Conference USA in 1995. In 2012 the university announced it would move to the Big East Conference (later renamed the American Athletic Conference) in all sports in July 2014.

Sports sponsored

Baseball

The Tulane baseball team, also established in 1893, is managed by head coach Travis Jewett. The program has appeared in the NCAA Tournament 21 times and in the College World Series twice. They play home games on campus at Turchin Stadium.

Men's basketball

The men's basketball team, established in 1905, is coached by Ron Hunter, who was hired following the 2018-19 season. They play their home games in Devlin Fieldhouse, named after a donation that enabled extensive renovations in 2012–13. It is the 9th-oldest active basketball venue in the nation.

Women's basketball

The women's team has been coached since 1995 by Lisa Stockton, who has led the program to 15 postseason tournaments, including 10 NCAA Tournament appearances. They play their home games in Devlin Fieldhouse, named after a donation that enabled extensive renovations in 2012–13. It is the 9th-oldest active basketball venue in the nation.

Women's beach volleyball
The Tulane Green Wave women's beach volleyball team competes in NCAA Division I beach volleyball in the Coastal Collegiate Sports Association (CCSA). The team was founded in 2011.

Football

The Tulane football team, established in 1893, competes in the NCAA Division I Football Bowl Subdivision. Green Wave football teams have won 9 conference championships, including 3 in the SEC and 1 in C-USA, and have appeared in 12 postseason bowl games. They are coached by Willie Fritz and play home games in Yulman Stadium.

Men's tennis
The Tulane Green Wave men's tennis team competes in NCAA Division I tennis and is part of the American Athletic Conference. The team won the NCAA tennis team championship in 1959. The men's tennis team also won eight singles team non-NCAA recognized national championships and two doubles team non-NCAA recognized national championships. It also won an individual indoor singles national championship.

Women's tennis
The Tulane Green Wave women's tennis team competes in NCAA Division I tennis and is part of the American Athletic Conference.

Women's volleyball
The Tulane Green Wave women's volleyball team competes in NCAA Division I volleyball and is part of the American Athletic Conference.

Championships

Men's conference championships
Baseball : 1948 • 1997 • 1998 • 2001 • 2005 • 2016
Tournament : 1979 • 1982 • 1992 • 1996 • 1998 • 1999 • 2001 • 2005
Basketball : 1944 • 1992
Cross Country : 2001
Football : 1920 • 1925 • 1929 • 1930 • 1931 • 1934 • 1939 • 1949 • 1998 • 2022
Tennis : 1997 • 2001 • 2003 • 2004 • 2005 • 2018

Women's conference championships
Basketball : 1997 • 1999 • 2007 • 2010
Tournament : 1997 • 1999 • 2000 • 2001 • 2010
Golf : 2004 • 2005 • 2009 • 2010 • 2013 • 2014 • 2022
Swimming/Diving : 2005
Tennis : 2001 • 2003 • 2004 • 2005
Volleyball : 2008
Tournament : 2008

NCAA team championships
Tulane has won one team national championship granted by the NCAA.

Men's (1) 
NCAA Tennis : 1959

Other national team championship
One national team title was bestowed by USA Rugby:
 Women’s Rugby : 2016 (Division II spring), lost full-year title game

Individual or event championships

Men's
Tennis Singles : 1930 • 1932 • 1936 • 1937 • 1949 • 1953 • 1954 • 1955
Indoor Tennis Singles : 2015
Tennis Doubles : 1957 • 1959
Golf : 1925 • 1926 • 1939
Boxing : 1932 (heavyweight)

Athletic facilities

Current facilities
Yulman Stadium — Football
Devlin Fieldhouse — Men's and women's basketball, Volleyball
Greer Field at Turchin Stadium — Baseball
City Park/Pepsi Tennis Center — Men's and women's tennis
Colonial Lanes — Women's bowling
English Turn Golf and Country Club — Men's and women's golf
Reily Student-Recreation Center Natatorium — Women's swimming and diving
Tad Gormley Stadium — Men's and women's track and field
White Sands Volleyball Courts — Beach volleyball

Practice facilities
Hertz Basketball/Volleyball Practice Facility — Men's and women's basketball, Volleyball

Former facilities
Crescent City Base Ball Park (1893–1900) — Football 
Athletic Park (1901–08) — Football
First Tulane Stadium (1909–16) — Football
Second Tulane Stadium (1917–25) — Football
Third Tulane Stadium (1926–74) — Football
Louisiana Superdome (1975–2013) — Football
AMF All Star Lanes (Kenner) — Women's bowling
Danny Thiel Track and Barney Mintz Auxiliary Field — Track and Field
George G. Westfeldt Complex — Soccer
Goldring Tennis Stadium — Tennis
Tulane Diamond (1893–1989) — Baseball
Tulane Gymnasium (1905–1933) — Men's basketball

Non-varsity athletic facilities
Reily Student-Recreation Center — Badminton, Basketball, Indoor soccer, Indoor track, Natatorium (Swimming), Racquetball, Rowing, Squash, Volleyball and Weightlifting
Brown Field — Flag football and Soccer
Tennis courts — Tennis

Traditions

Logo and mascot

Tulane officials commissioned John Chase in 1945 to illustrate the covers of its football game programs. He came up with Greenie, a mischievous boy who would be considered an unofficial mascot by many fans.  Chase illustrated Greenie on program covers until 1969.

In 1963 the Athletics Director and Eldon Endacott, manager of the university bookstore, contacted Art Evans, a commercial artist who already had designed the Boilermaker mascot for Purdue University, the Wisconsin Badgers and the University of Southern California Trojan, to create a new mascot for Tulane athletics. His design for a mean-looking anthropomorphic wave-crest was officially adopted in 1964.
   
A new logo consisting of a white block "T" with green and blue waves crossing its center was adopted in 1986 as the primary symbol for official uniforms, though the "Angry Wave" cartoon continued to be used in licensed products, and a costumed wave nicknamed Gumby also served as the mascot.

A full redesign of all athletics logos and marks was commissioned in 1998, replacing the "angry wave" and "wavy T" designs with a green and blue oblique T crested by a foamy wave. Gumby was replaced with a new pelican mascot, recalling the university seal, and the fact that a pelican was often used in the first half of the century as the emblem of Tulane's athletics teams. The pelican is also the Louisiana state bird and is found on the state flag and state seal. The name "Riptide" was selected for the performing pelican by the administration after a vote of the student body in which the students actually voted that the pelican be named "Pecker." The pelican mascot name may have been so voted as the student body had also overwhelmingly voted for Poseidon to be the mascot. Poseidon was rejected by the administration and student body government because it could be portrayed as a white male. In 2014, Tulane changed the color of the "wave" above the "T" from a seafoam green to a color closer to lime green.

In 2017, Tulane announced that the "T-Wave" would be replaced as the primary logo by a redesigned "Angry Wave".

Notable sports alumni

Football
Shaun King (Tampa Bay Buccaneers)
Patrick Ramsey (Denver Broncos)
J. P. Losman (Miami Dolphins)
Anthony Cannon (Detroit Lions)
Mewelde Moore (Pittsburgh Steelers)
Matt Forte (New York Jets)
Cairo Santos (New York Jets)
Orleans Darkwa (New York Giants)
Robert Kelley (Washington Redskins)

Darnell Mooney(Chicago Bears)

Baseball
Andy Cannizaro (Cleveland Indians)
Tommy Manzella (Houston Astros)
Micah Owings (Cincinnati Reds)
Brandon Gomes (Tampa Bay Rays)

Green Wave Club
The Green Wave Club, formerly known as the Tulane Athletics Fund, is the official fundraising arm of Tulane Green Wave, supporting Green Wave student-athletes in their academic, athletic, and community pursuits by providing unrestricted annual funds to the Athletics department.

In 2007 the fund set a record for membership with 2,210 donors contributing. In 2011 it spearheaded the "Home Field Advantage" campaign to fully fund the $73 million construction of Yulman Stadium on the Uptown campus through private donations.

Athletics reform
After coming off a winning season and a Hawaii Bowl victory in 2003, it was leaked that Former President Scott Cowen and the Board of Trustees was planning to vote on either doing away with a commitment to Division 1 football, or propose scaling down to Division 3 due to their concern for the long-term financial viability of sustaining a Division 1 athletic program in the changing BCS landscape.  When the news leaked, the outrage by fans, alumni, and boosters forced the Board of Trustees to pivot and claim it actually intended to undertake a comprehensive "review" of athletics. The outcome of the review was a commitment to maintaining a Division I athletic program, and also included points to address academic performance, graduation rates, financial viability, and support for athletics within the overall University mission. (In 2003 Tulane's graduation rate for student-athletes stood at 79%, ranking 14th among all Division I programs.)

Scott Cowen began a dialog with other university presidents calling for a change to the existing system that rewards established powers at the expense of less successful programs. His criticisms, in particular of the Bowl Championship Series (BCS) in football, led to the creation of the Presidential Coalition for Athletics Reform and opened the door for hearings on college athletics revenues in the Senate Judiciary Committee in October 2003. On February 29, 2004, the BCS met in Miami, Florida, and agreed to amend revenue distribution and open the series to more opportunities for BCS non-AQ teams. As a member of the BCS Presidential Oversight Committee, Cowen was active in decision-making regarding the future of college football.

Effects of Hurricane Katrina

As a result of Hurricane Katrina in August 2005, Tulane's varsity sports teams, with the exception of cross country and track and field, moved to four universities in Texas and Louisiana for the remainder of that academic semester, while continuing to represent Tulane in competition:
Louisiana Tech University: football
Southern Methodist University: men's and women's golf
Texas A&M University: men's basketball, women's swimming and diving, women's volleyball, women's soccer, men's tennis, and women's tennis
Texas Tech University: baseball and women's basketball

For its fortitude in the face of Katrina, the 2005 Tulane football team received Disney's Wide World of Sports Spirit Award and the Football Writers Association of America Annual Courage Award. The university's Renewal Plan called for the suspension of some of its sports, and it did not return to a full 16 teams until the 2011–12 school year.

See also
List of NCAA Division I institutions

References

External links